Nicholas Marfelt (born 15 September 1994) is a Danish footballer who plays as a left-back for Brønshøj Boldklub.

Football career
Marfelt progressed through the youth academy of Hvidovre IF apart from a four-year spell in the renowned Nordsjælland academy. He joined FC Helsingør as a senior player in 2016. 

On 30 January 2017, it was announced that Marfelt had moved to SønderjyskE, where he had signed a three-and-a-half-year contract. He had previously been on a trial with Brøndby, which, however, did not result in a contract. He made his Danish Superliga debut for SønderjyskE on 12 March 2017 in a game against OB. Just six months after signing with SønderjyskE, Marfelt joined Dutch Eredivisie club Sparta Rotterdam on a loan agreement valid for the remainder of the 2017–18 season. He was released from his loan only six months into the deal due to lacking playing time, and returned to SønderjyskE.

On 30 July 2020, it was announced that HB Køge had signed Marfelt on a two-year contract. He immediately scored in his debut for the club, helping secure a 2–1 win over his former team, Hvidovre, on 11 September. On 6 January 2022 Køge confirmed, that Marfelt had got his contract terminated by mutual consent, retiring from professional football to instead focus on studying.

On 16 January 2022, Marfelt signed with Denmark Series club Brønshøj Boldklub on an amateur deal.

Honours
SønderjyskE
Danish Cup: 2019–20

References

1994 births
Footballers from Copenhagen
Living people
Danish men's footballers
Danish expatriate men's footballers
Hvidovre IF players
FC Nordsjælland players
FC Helsingør players
SønderjyskE Fodbold players
Sparta Rotterdam players
HB Køge players
Brønshøj Boldklub players
Eredivisie players
Danish Superliga players
Danish 1st Division players
Association football defenders
Danish expatriate sportspeople in the Netherlands
Expatriate footballers in the Netherlands